Peryt Shou (legal name Albert Christian Georg [Jörg] Schultz) (22 April 1873 - 24 October 1953) was a German mysticist and Germanic pagan revivalist. He is mentioned briefly by Goodrick-Clarke (The Occult Roots of Nazism, 1985: 165) as a writer of novels with occult themes and a significant figure in the post-World War I German occult movement. During Nazi Germany, he apparently went without being molested.

He was born the son of an innkeeper in Kroslin near Wolgast in Pomerania. Schultz studied in Berlin and devoted himself to poetry, painting and eventually the secret sciences. During the course of his career he authored some forty books, most of which have been forgotten and lost in obscurity. However, he remains one of the most important esotericists of 20th-century Germany. This is mainly because his works, although obscure, were nevertheless extremely influential on other German occultists and esotericists of the day. His writings are known to have influenced Walter Nauhaus, the co-founder of the Thule Society (Goodrick-Clarke 1985: 143).

Aleister Crowley, while in Berlin showing his paintings, wrote in his diary for 11 February 1932: "[ Krumm-Heller ] here with Peryt Shou".

See also
Ariosophy
Dowsing
Nazi occultism
Pendulum
Karl Spiesberger

External links
Odinist Library: The Life of Peryt Shou
More on Shou
Even more on Shou

German occultists
Germanic mysticism
1873 births
1953 deaths
German modern pagans
Adherents of Germanic neopaganism
Modern pagan writers